North Tripura is an administrative district in the state of Tripura in India. The district headquarters are located at Dharmanagar. The district occupies an area of 1422.19 km² and has a population of 693,947 (as of 2011).

History
The territory occupied by North Tripura district was part of the princely state of Tripura until 9 September 1949, when it was merged with the Union of India. The district came into existence on 1 September 1970, when the entire state was divided into three districts. On 14 April. 1995 Dhalai district was carved out from this district. Tripura was divided into four districts but with effect from 21 January 2012 four more new districts was divided making a total of eight districts in the state.

Divisions

Administrative divisions
North Tripura is divided into three sub-divisions:

Subdivision & Blocks. There are 3 nos of Sub-Division and 8 nos of Blocks under North Tripura District.

Political constituencies
There are eleven assembly constituencies in this district: Pabiachhara, Fatikroy, Chandipur, Kailasahar, Kadamtala-Kurti, Bagbassa, Dharmanagar, Jubarajnagar, Panisagar, Pencharthal and Kanchanpur.

North Tripura district is in the Lok Sabha constituency of Tripura East, which is shared with Dhalai and South Tripura districts.

Villages
 

Icabpur

Demographics
According to the 2011 census total population of the District is 693,947. 12% of the total population of Tripura. The overall literacy assessment survey (LAS) conducted by SLMA-2016, the literacy rate 97.22% ( Male : 97.34% & Female : 96.79%) & the Sex ratio is 967/1000 (F/M) (State 960/1000) as per population census-2011.

Flora and fauna
In 1988 North Tripura district became home to the Rowa Wildlife Sanctuary, which has an area of 0.85 km².

References

External links 
 Official website of North Tripura district

 
Districts of Tripura
1970 establishments in Tripura